TER Poitou-Charentes was the regional rail network serving the Poitou-Charentes région in France. In 2017 it was merged into the new TER Nouvelle-Aquitaine.

Network

Rail

Road 
 Angoulême – Jonzac
 Poitiers – Parthenay – Bressuire – Cholet – Nantes
 Thouars – Loudun – Chinon
 Poitiers – Chauvigny – Le Blanc – Châteauroux
 Niort – Fontenay-le-Comte
 La Rochelle – Fontenay-le-Comte

Rolling Stock

Multiple units

 SNCF Class Z 7300
 SNCF Class Z 21500
 SNCF Class X 2100
 SNCF Class X 2200
 SNCF Class X 72500
 SNCF Class X 73500
 SNCF Class Z 27500 (ZGC Z 27500)

Locomotives

 SNCF Class BB 22200

Buses

 Iveco Bus
 Arway

Future

Niort – Fontenay-le-Comte line 

25% of this line, closed to passenger traffic since 1969, is located in Poitou-Charentes, with the remainder located in Pays de la Loire.

The reopening of the line was included in the Contract for Regional and State Projects (Contrat de projets État-région) for 2006-2007 and preliminary studies are completed. Work was scheduled to begin once the interregional budget was in place but as of October 2014, the line has not been reopened and TER's operations between Niort and Fontenay-le-Comte are restricted to bus travel.

Thouars – Parthenay – Niort line

This line has been closed to passenger traffic since 1980 but it is still used to transport empty TER trains every Wednesday. The trains are from the Bressuire – Thouars – Saumur line and they are sent to Saintes for maintenance. These trains are allowed to travel at speeds between 70–80 km/h, although higher speeds would be possible on certain sections of the line.

Expansion of the La Rochelle-Rochefort line 

With 11 trains a day added between in 2007 and 2008, the expansion of this line is meant to help curb the growing road traffic between the cities of La Rochelle and Rochefort.

Five additional stops have been opened:
 Saint-Laurent Fouras (September 2007)
 Angoulins-sur-Mer (September 2007)
 La Rochelle Porte Dauphine (late 2008)
 Aytré-Plage (September 2008)
 Tonnay-Charente (2010)

See also
SNCF
Transport express régional
Réseau Ferré de France
List of SNCF stations
List of SNCF stations in Poitou-Charentes
Poitou-Charentes

References

External links 
  TER Poitou-Charentes website
  Association régionale Poitou-Charentes des usagers du TER – Regional association of passengers of Poitou-Charentes TER trains
  Map of the TER Poitou-Charentes network

 
TER